Adaro was a German medieval folk rock band active from 1997 to 2006.

Style
While their first CD, Stella Splendens, was based mainly on Spanish songs from the 13th and 14th century, the later works incorporated late medieval songs from the Minnesang tradition by artists such as Hans Sachs, Walther von der Vogelweide and Oswald von Wolkenstein.

The album Minnenspiel (2002) has been lauded for being a fresh, original work in the Mittelalter rock genre featuring very melodic and modern sound structures. The German Sonic Seducer magazine noted the contrast between the clear Heavenly Voices style of singer Konstanze Kulinsky and Christoph Pelgen's smooth male vocals, as well as the perfect mastering of the instruments on this record.

The 2004 album Words never spoken - Extended Edition which includes the tracks of the Words never spoken EP (1999) was noted to have a rather light style reminiscent of Pop rock.

Discography 
 1997: Stella Splendens (Akku Disk)
 1999: Words never spoken (EP, Akku Disk)
 2002: Minnenspiel (SPV)
 2004: Schlaraffenland (Inside Out)
 2004: Words never spoken - Extended Edition (Inside Out)

References

German folk music groups
Medieval folk rock groups
Musical groups established in 1997
Musical groups disestablished in 2006
1997 establishments in Germany
2006 disestablishments in Germany